Bimal Lakra (born 4 May 1980) is a former Indian field hockey player who played as a midfielder for national team.  He was part of the team that won the silver medal at the 2002 Asian Games.

Lakra's younger brother Birendra Lakra and younger sister Asunta Lakra have also represented India in field hockey.

References

External links
Player profile at Hockey India

1980 births
Living people
People from Simdega district
Indian male field hockey players
Field hockey players from Jharkhand
Asian Games silver medalists for India
Asian Games medalists in field hockey
Field hockey players at the 2002 Asian Games
Medalists at the 2002 Asian Games